Kenneth Wayne "Swoop" Carleton (born August 4, 1946) is a Canadian former professional ice hockey player. Carleton played in the National Hockey League (NHL) and the World Hockey Association (WHA) in the 1960s and 1970s. He was a member of the 1970 Boston Bruins Stanley Cup champions.

Playing career
Carleton played junior hockey for the Toronto Marlboros, from 1961–62 to 1965–66. During this period, with Carleton playing a starring role, the Marlboros won the 1964 Memorial Cup.

Carleton was called up by the Toronto Maple Leafs, for 2 games, during the 1965–66 NHL season.  He earned a regular spot with the Leafs the following season, and would later play with the Boston Bruins and California Golden Seals.

Carleton was a member of one Stanley Cup championship team, the 1969–70 Bruins. He was on the ice as the left wing on Derek Sanderson's line when Bobby Orr scored his famous Cup-clinching goal in the fourth game of the 1970 Stanley Cup Final.

Carleton played in the NHL until the 1971–72 NHL season, after which he moved to the WHA and played for the Ottawa Nationals, Toronto Toros, Edmonton Oilers, Birmingham Bulls, and New England Whalers.

Career statistics

Regular season and playoffs

External links
 

1946 births
Living people
Birmingham Bulls players
Boston Bruins players
California Golden Seals players
Canadian ice hockey forwards
Edmonton Oilers (WHA) players
Ice hockey people from Ontario
New England Whalers players
Ontario Hockey Association Senior A League (1890–1979) players
Ottawa Nationals players
Phoenix Roadrunners (WHL) players
Rochester Americans players
Sportspeople from Greater Sudbury
Stanley Cup champions
Toronto Maple Leafs players
Toronto Marlboros players
Toronto Toros players
Tulsa Oilers (1964–1984) players